(born July 11, 1972) is a Japanese cross-country skier who has competed since 1995. Competing in three Winter Olympics, he earned his best career and individual finishes at Nagano in 1998 with a seventh in the 4 x 10 km relay and 21st in the 10 km + 15 km combined pursuit, respectively.

Ebisawa's best finish at the FIS Nordic World Ski Championships was 15th in the 30 km event at Trondheim in 1997. His best World Cup finish was ninth in an individual sprint event in Germany in 1996.

Ebisawa's best career finish was second three times at FIS races up to 30 km from 1996 to 2007.

External links
 
 Olympic 4 x 10 km relay results: 1936–2002 

1972 births
Living people
Japanese male cross-country skiers
Olympic cross-country skiers of Japan
Cross-country skiers at the 1998 Winter Olympics
Cross-country skiers at the 2002 Winter Olympics
Cross-country skiers at the 2006 Winter Olympics
Asian Games medalists in cross-country skiing
Asian Games gold medalists for Japan
Asian Games silver medalists for Japan
Asian Games bronze medalists for Japan
Cross-country skiers at the 1999 Asian Winter Games
Cross-country skiers at the 2003 Asian Winter Games
Cross-country skiers at the 2007 Asian Winter Games
Medalists at the 1999 Asian Winter Games
Medalists at the 2003 Asian Winter Games
Medalists at the 2007 Asian Winter Games
21st-century Japanese people
20th-century Japanese people